Al Ḩāffah or simply Ḩāfa is a coastal village in Dhofar Governorate, in southwestern Oman. It lies just south of Salalah.

History
In 1908, J. G. Lorimer recorded Rakhyut in his Gazetteer of the Persian Gulf, noting its location as being about 2 miles east of Salalah on the coast, along which it extends quarter of a mile. He wrote:

References

Populated places in the Dhofar Governorate